Frangcyatma Alves Ima Kefi (born 27 January 1997) is a football player who currently plays as forward for Pro Liga de Timor Leste club DIT FC  and Timor-Leste national football team. He use to play for Persiku Dynamo Kupang in Indonesia.

International career
Carlos made his senior international debut in a 0-2 loss against Cambodia in an exhibition match on 29 May 2016.

References

1997 births
Living people
East Timorese footballers
Timor-Leste international footballers
East Timorese expatriate footballers
Expatriate footballers in Indonesia
East Timorese expatriate sportspeople in Indonesia
Association football forwards
Footballers at the 2018 Asian Games
Competitors at the 2017 Southeast Asian Games
Asian Games competitors for East Timor
Southeast Asian Games competitors for East Timor